The 2010 World Ringette Championships (2010 WRC) was an international ringette tournament and the 9th (IX) World Ringette Championships. The tournament was organized by the International Ringette Federation (IRF) and was contested in Tampere, Finland, between November 1 and November 6, 2010. The main competition took place at the Tampere Ice Stadium. The previous year the 2009 World Junior Ringette Championships took place in Prague, becoming the inaugural event for elite junior ringette athletes, but was organized as a separate event from the World Ringette Championships program.

Overview
Participating teams were Team Canada Senior, Team Finland Senior, Team Sweden, and  Team USA. The group stage was played in a round-robin series. The finals and bronze medal games were played in a best-of-three playoff format.

Venue

Teams

Group stage

Points

Top scorers

Bronze medal games

Top scorers

Finals

Top scorers

Final standings

Personal awards

Best players by team
 Jennifer Hartley
 Heidi Ahlberg
 Linda Björling
 Catherine Cartier

All-Star Team
Goalkeeper:  Heidi Ahlberg
Defense:  Beth Hurren
Defense:  Jonna Ruotsalainen
Forward:  Jennifer Hartley
Forward:  
Forward:   (née Kyhälä)

Most Valuable Player
  (née Kyhälä)

Rosters

Team Finland
The 2010 Team Finland team included the following:

Team Canada
Team Canada competed in the 2010 World Ringette Championships. Canada sent 22 athletes. The team included a back up group of athletes who trained as members of the national team in case they were required to participate.

The 2010 Team Canada team included the following:

Team Sweden

The 2010 Sweden Senior team included the following:

Team USA
The 2010 USA Senior team included the following:

See also
 World Ringette Championships
 International Ringette Federation
  Canada national ringette team
  Finland national ringette team
  Sweden national ringette team
  United States national ringette team

References

External links 
 (archived 2010) 2010 World Ringette Championships Official Homepage
 2010 World Ringette Championships Official Homepage (English and Finnish)
 

Ringette
Ringette competitions
World Ringette Championships
Ringette
Ringette
Ringette
November 2010 sports events in Europe